
Year 632 (DCXXXII) was a leap year starting on Wednesday (link will display the full calendar) of the Julian calendar. The denomination 632 for this year has been used since the early medieval period, when the Anno Domini calendar era became the prevalent method in Europe for naming years.

Events 
 By place 

 Arabia 
 March 18 (approximate) – Muhammad makes his final sermon to the Muslims.   It is believed by Shia to be the appointment of Ali ibn Abi Talib as his successor. The Imamah (Shia doctrine) of Ali Ibn Abi Talib, for the religious, spiritual and political leadership of the Ummah, begins.
 June 8 – Muhammad dies at Medina at the age of 63, after an illness and fever.
 June – Abu Bakr (also known as Abdallah ibn Uthman ibn Amir, better known by his Islamic laqab Al-Siddiq) becomes the Caliph.
 Ridda Wars: Abu Bakr launches a series of military campaigns against rebel Arabian tribes, to re-establish the power of the Rightly Guided Caliphs, and to secure Muhammad's legacy.
 September – Battle of Buzakha: An Islamic column (6,000 men) under Khalid ibn al-Walid defeats the Apostate rebels under Tulayha, near Ha'il (Saudi Arabia).   
 December – Battle of Aqraba: The Muslim forces of Abu Bakr defeat the Apostate rebels (40,000 men) under Musaylimah, on the plain of Aqraba.

 Europe 
 April 8 – King Charibert II is assassinated at Blaye (Gironde), (possibly on orders of his half-brother Dagobert I), along with his infant son. Dagobert I claims Aquitaine and Gascony, becoming the most powerful Merovingian king in the West. 
 Part of Samo's rebellion, Alciocus leads 9,000 Bulgars from Pannonia to refuge with Dagobert (who massacres them), then, with 700 survivors, settles with the Wends, under the protection of Walluc.
 Kubrat, ruler of the Dulo clan, takes power from the Pannonian Avars and establishes Old Great Bulgaria in the area of Black Cumania. Kubrat's rule stretches from Dacia to Poltava.

 Persia 
 June 16 – Yazdegerd III, age 8, ascends to the throne as king (shah) of the Persian Empire. He becomes the last ruler of the Sassanid Dynasty (modern Iran).

 Asia 
 January 27 – An annular eclipse of the sun occurs.
 Seondeok is crowned queen of Silla (Korea).

 Armenia 
 The 632 Armenia earthquake affects the region of the Armenian Highlands.

 By topic 

 Religion 
 March 6 (Friday, 9 Zulhijja, 10 AH) – The Farewell Sermon (Khuṭbatu l-Wadāʿ) is delivered by  Muhammad, Islamic prophet, in the Uranah valley of Mount Arafat, to the Muslims who have accompanied him for the Hajj (pilgrimage).
 June 8 – Muhammad dies in Medina, at the age of 62, and is succeeded by Abu Bakr who becomes the first caliph (viceregent of the messenger of God). He establishes the Rashidun Caliphate until 661.
 Xuanzang, Chinese traveler, writes about two huge statues of Buddha carved out of a mountainside in the Bamiyan Valley (Afghanistan).

Births 
 Al-Muhallab ibn Abi Sufra, Arab general (d. 702)
 Vindicianus, bishop of Cambrai (approximate date)

Deaths 
 January 31 – Máedóc, bishop of Ferns 
 April 8 – Charibert II, king of Aquitaine
 June 8 – Muhammad, Islamic Prophet (b. 570)
 August 11 – Rusticula (b. c. 556), abbess of Arles
 August 28 – Fatimah, daughter of Muhammad
 October 12 or 633 – Edwin of Northumbria, king of Deira and Bernicia
 October 29 – Saint Colman mac Duagh, Irish abbot and bishop 
 Abu Dujana, companion of Muhammad
 Chilperic, son of Charibert II
 Ibrahim ibn Muhammad, son of Muhammad
 Abdullah ibn Suhayl (b. 594) (martyred)
 Abu Hudhayfa ibn Utba (b. 581) (martyred)
 Salim Mawla Abu Hudhayfa (b. c. 594–596) (martyred)
 Zayd ibn al-Khattab (b. before 584) (martyred)
 Musaylimah, Arabian prophet

References